Michael J. Carey (born 1960) is an American entrepreneur and one of four founders of ATLAS Space Operations, Inc. Upon retiring after 32 years of military service, he became CEO and President of AAC Microtec North America, Inc., founded M. Carey Consultants, LLC, and CompressWave, LLC.
He is a retired American military officer who served in the United States Air Force. Enlisted on September 17, 1977, he retired on June 1, 2014, as a brigadier general, after 32 years of military service.

Career
Carey enlisted in the Air Force in 1977. On April 29, 1983, he became a second lieutenant; on August 5, 1985 – first lieutenant; on August 5, 1987 – captain; on November 11, 1994 – major; on January 1, 1998 – lieutenant colonel; on August 1, 2002 – colonel; on November 14, 2008 – brigadier general; and on November 2, 2011, he was promoted to major general. His assignments included serving as deputy director of global operations, Global Operations Directorate, USSTRATCOM (March 2008 – August 2010); Chief, USSTRATCOM Forward Integration Team, Kabul, Afghanistan (June 2009 – August 2009); deputy director of command, control and nuclear operations (J3), Joint Staff, the Pentagon, Washington, D.C. (August 2010 – June 2012), among others.

In 2013, Carey was reprimanded and relieved of command of the 20th Air Force and Task Force 214 following incidents occurring during the two-day U.S.-Russian Federation Nuclear Security Exercise in Sergeiv Posad, Moscow, Russia. During the event, it was reported that Carey had consumed excessive alcohol and otherwise behaved in a manner unbecoming an officer. On April 10, 2014, it was announced that Carey would retire on June 1, 2014, in the rank of brigadier general.

Upon retirement from the USAF, Gen Carey founded a consultancy, M. Carey Consultants, LLC as a Traverse City, Michigan-based small business that provides leadership training and advising, as well as defense-related advice to clients.

Education
1982 Bachelor of Arts degree in history, University of Central Florida, Orlando
1986 Squadron Officer School, Maxwell AFB, Alabama
1988 Master of Public Administration degree, University of Oklahoma, Norman
1995 Air Command and Staff College (distinguished graduate), Maxwell AFB, Alabama
1998 Armed Forces Staff College, Joint and Combined Staff Officer School, Norfolk, Virginia
1999 Air War College, by correspondence
2001 Master of Arts degree in national security and strategic studies (with distinction), Naval War College, Newport, Rhode Island
2005 National Security Fellow, Maxwell School, Syracuse University, New York
2008 National Committee on U.S.-China Relations China Seminar, New York
2010 U.S.–Russia Course, Harvard University, Cambridge, Mass.

Awards and decorations

References

External links

1960 births
Living people
University of Central Florida alumni
University of Oklahoma alumni
Naval War College alumni
United States Air Force generals
People from Traverse City, Michigan
Military personnel from Michigan